Recreational Road 255 (RE 255) is a Recreational Road located in Tyler, Jasper, and Newton counties, in the southeastern region of the U.S. state of Texas. RE 255 begins at an intersection with U.S. Route 69 (US 69), in Tyler County, near the city of Colmesneil. The route travels through rural farmland in northern Tyler County, and crosses the Neches River into Jasper County. The roadway intersects State Highway 63 (TX 63) and US 96, and helps form part of the Sam Rayburn Dam. The route continues into Newton County, intersecting TX 87, before terminating at an intersection with Farm to Market Road 692 (FM 692), near the Louisiana border. RE 255 helps provide access to Angelina National Forest, the Sam Rayburn Reservoir, and the Toledo Bend Reservoir, which give the highway its Recreational Road designation.

Recreational Road 255 began as Farm to Market Road 255, with the first section of the route being designated in 1945. Throughout the 1950s and the 1960s, FM 255 was extended several times, with the final extension being made in early 1970. The first stretch of RE 255 was designated in 1970 by Minute Order 063535, creating the first Recreational Road. The highway was extended three more times in the 1970s, completely replacing FM 255. FM 255 had a short spur that was designated in 1970, and was transferred over to RE 255 in 1974 when the main route was replaced. RE 255 Spur was cancelled in 1979.

Route description

Tyler County
Recreational Road 255 begins at its western terminus at an intersection with U.S. Route 69 as a two-lane, paved road. The highway proceeds eastward through mainly rural areas, passing several small farms. The roadway continues, intersecting County Route 3251 (CR 3251) and turning northeast. The road proceeds northeast before slowly bending east again and continuing. It proceeds through the small community of Oak Grove and turns northeasterly. RE 255 continues, passing several homes and the small Gregory Cemetery as well as intersecting several county roads and slowly bending east. The route continues easterly, passing through a large forest and intersecting CR 3725 before crossing the Neches River and exiting Tyler County.

Jasper County
After crossing the Neches River, RE 255 enters Jasper County and proceeds easterly. After a short distance, it crosses over a small relief creek for the Neches River and continues through heavily forested rural areas before turning slightly southeast. The route proceeds over a small creek before slowly bending northeastward. The roadway turns northerly and passes the small community of Beans. While traveling through Beans, the road passes several small farms and houses. It also intersects several county roads, including the former RE 255 Spur, which is now CR 32. The highway then enters Angelina National Forest.

Recreational Road 255 continues slightly northeasterly, passing through mainly farmland before reaching its junction with SH 63. RE 255 continues northward, entering the community of Ebenezer and intersecting a few local roads in the community. The roadway proceeds east and passes the McGee Cemetery. RE 255 proceeds to the Angelina River at the Sam Rayburn Dam. The road bends northeastward, passing through the small Overlook Park and continuing northeast along the dam. It turns southeast and continues along the dam. The roadway continues, taking a large bend southeast and intersecting several local roads that lead to the reservoir. The highway proceeds southeasterly, passing several small homes and businesses that make up a portion of the community of Sam Rayburn. RE 255 proceeds northeast for a short distance before shifting eastward through Rayburn Country and intersecting FM 1007. Turning southeast, the route passes the southern edge of the Rayburn Country golf resort before exiting the community of Sam Rayburn and reentering rural areas. RE 255 shifts southeast and proceeds to an intersection with U.S. Route 96, a divided highway. The route bends northeasterly, intersecting CR 232 before proceeding out of Jasper County.

Newton County

RE 255 enters Newton County traveling eastward. The highway proceeds eastward before bending northeasterly and entering dense forest. Continuing eastward, the road reaches an intersection with SH 87. The route continues east, passing the Mitchell Cemetery. The highway intersects a couple of county routes and turns east before crossing over a small cove on the Toledo Bend Reservoir. RE 255 the enters the community of South Toledo Bend. It travels parallel to the reservoir, passing several small neighborhoods before shifting eastward. RE 255 passes the Shady Oaks Marina and the Sam Forse Collins Recreational Area before reaching its eastern terminus at an at-grade intersection with FM 692.

History

The first portion of what would become RE 255 was designated on June 12, 1945 as the first stretch of Farm to Market Road 255 (FM 255). On September 27, 1960, FM 255 was extended  northeastward to the McGee Bend Dam on Lake Sam Rayburn. FM 255 was extended on June 15, 1961 along a road that traveled along the McGee Bend Dam to an intersection with US 96. In 1962, three small bridges were constructed in western Jasper County. These bridges still function along the modern route. On October 1, 1963, FM 255 was extended approximately  southeastward from SH 63. In 1965, the current bridge over the Angelina River was constructed. FM 2628 from US 69 east 4.4 miles and FM 3125 from SH 87 to FM 692 were combined with the route on February 15, 1970, adding  and  respectively to FM 255.

On April 1, 1970, Recreational Road 255 was officially designated by TxDOT Minute Order 063535. The route was approved by the TxDOT's Administration Circle on April 15, 1970. RE 255 was the first route to be designated by the TxDOT as a Recreational Road. In 1971, the modern bridge crossing over the small Indian Creek, located in western Jasper County, was constructed. In 1976, the current bridge crossing the small Rocky Creek in western Newton County was constructed. In 1977, three of the route's current bridges were constructed. Two of the bridges cross over the Neches River and the other is a small bridge located in Newton County. In 1981, the last two current bridges along the route were constructed. Both are small bridges located in western Newton County. Twelve years after being cancelled, FM 255 was redesignated to a short road in Webb County. This route has since been cancelled and redesignated as Urban Road 255, which was cancelled and added to SH 255.

Future
Recreational Road 255 is located within the study area of the proposed Interstate 14, the Gulf Coast Strategic Highway. The current proposed routing of the Interstate would run along State Highway 63, to the south of RE 255, but no official routing has decided on. A possible alternative routing of the highway would replace RE 255 as part of the Interstate.

Major junctions

Spur route

Recreational Road 255 Spur (RE 255 Spur) was a short spur connection of FM 255 and later RE 255 that connected the small Beans community in Jasper County to RE 255.

RE 255 Spur began at an intersection with RE 255 near Beans Community, inside the southern edge of Angelina National Forest. The highway proceeded southeastward through rural areas, passing several small fields and houses. The roadway continued to its eastern terminus, a dead end point.

RE 255 Spur was originally designated on February 15, 1970, as FM 255 Spur, on its present location. The spur was redesignated as RE 255 on March 15, 1974. The spur was cancelled and turned back to local maintenance on December 18, 1979. The route has since been added to CR 1002.

Major junctions

See also

Notes

References

External links

0255
Transportation in Tyler County, Texas
Transportation in Jasper County, Texas
Transportation in Newton County, Texas